Vevay can refer to:

 Vevay, Indiana
 Vevay Township, Michigan

See also
Vevey (disambiguation)